Jane Fleming Kleeb is an American political executive and activist. She is the founder and president of Bold Alliance, Chair of the Nebraska Democratic Party and a board member of Our Revolution and Matriarch PAC.

Early life and education 
Kleeb was born and raised in South Florida, where her mother was head of Broward County Right to Life. Kleeb earned a Bachelor of Arts degree from Stetson University, where she studied religious and leadership studies. In 2001, she earned a Master of Arts in International Training and Education from American University.

Career 
Kleeb began her career as Executive Director of AmeriCorps Tallahassee in 1996. She was Executive Director of Renfrew Center Foundation for Eating Disorders where she helped to develop a program that stresses activism as a tool for recovery, later she became the lead consultant on the 2006 documentary film Thin. Afterward she became the executive director of Young Democrats of America where she met her husband Scott Kleeb while he was campaigning for a congressional seat. She then worked as an MTV Street Teamer during her husband's 2008 campaign for U.S. Senate. In 2008, she worked as the Nebraska State Director for Change That Works, an effort to influence Senator Ben Nelson's vote on healthcare reform. In 2010, she was elected to the Hastings School Board.

Bold Nebraska 

In 2010 Bold Nebraska was formed with the objective of pushing progressive ideas in rural Nebraska. It quickly became the primary opposition organization in the state against the proposed Keystone XL pipeline.

After witnessing the opposition in a United States Department of State hearing in York, Nebraska Kleeb began organizing locals. She garnered the support of local landowner Randy Thompson and Omaha lawyer David Domina. Kleeb and Thompson held meetings with landowners and locals who would be affected by the pipeline, either farms in the direct path or ranches that depend on the Ogallala Aquifer. In 2011 Thompson was used as the face of the movement with the slogan, "Stand With Randy." The campaign eventually led to the University of Nebraska cutting advertising ties with TransCanada. By the end of 2011 the pipeline had become a national issue.

In 2016 the organization fell under the newly-formed Bold Alliance of which Kleeb is the founder and president.

Nebraska Democratic Party 
In June 2016 Kleeb was elected as Chair of the Nebraska Democratic Party by 42 votes out of 410 cast defeating 2014 gubernatorial nominee Chuck Hassebrook, with Frank LaMere winning first vice-chair.

Our Revolution 
On August 29, 2016, it was announced that Kleeb would serve as the treasurer and board member of Our Revolution, a progressive 501(c) organization created as an offshoot of the Bernie Sanders 2016 presidential campaign.

Personal life 
She lives in Hastings, Nebraska with her husband Scott Kleeb and their three daughters.

References 

Activists from Nebraska
American political activists
Living people
Nebraska Democrats
American University alumni
Stetson University alumni
People from Hastings, Nebraska
State political party chairs of Nebraska
Women in Nebraska politics
Year of birth missing (living people)
21st-century American women